South Dakota state elections in 2020 were held on Tuesday, November 3, 2020. Its primary elections were held on June 2, 2020 (with runoffs on August 11, 2020).

In addition to the U.S. presidential race, South Dakota voters will elect the Class II U.S. Senator from South Dakota, 1 of 3 seats on the state's Public Utilities Commission, its at-large seat to the House of Representatives, 1 of 5 seats on the South Dakota Supreme Court, all of the seats of the South Dakota House of Representatives and all of the seats in the South Dakota State Senate. There are also three ballot measures which will be voted on.

Federal offices

President of the United States

South Dakota has 3 electoral votes in the Electoral College.

United States Class II Senate Seat

United States House of Representatives

Incumbent Dusty Johnson is running for re-election.

Public Utilities Commission
Incumbent Gary Hanson is running for another term.

Polling

Results

State Judiciary
Incumbent Steven Jensen is up for re-election to an 8-year term in the state Supreme Court. He was appointed by Governor Mike Rounds.

State Legislature

All 70 seats of the South Dakota House of Representatives and all 35 seats of the South Dakota State Senate were up for election. Before the election the composition of the South Dakota State Legislature was:

State Senate

House of Representatives

After the election the composition of the South Dakota State Legislature was:

State Senate

House of Representatives

Ballot measures
South Dakota Initiated Measure 26, Medical Marijuana Initiative would mandate a program for access to medicinal cannabis for adults with certain pre-existing conditions.

South Dakota Constitutional Amendment A, Marijuana Legalization Initiative would adults at least 21 years old to recreationally consume marijuana by requiring the state legislature to pass laws providing for the sale of hemp in addition to the use of medical marijuana by April 1, 2022.

Polling 
A poll by Public Opinion Strategies taken from June 27–30, 2020 and sponsored by the No Way On A Committee (which opposes both measures) showed that support for Amendment A was around 60% and support for Initiated Measure 26 was at 70%.

Initiated Measure 26

Amendment A

Results

Constitutional Amendment A

Constitutional Amendment B

Initiated Measure 26

Notes

References

External links
 
 

 
South Dakota